MBC M (formerly MBC Music) is a South Korean specialty television channel owned by MBC Plus Media. The cable channel primarily broadcasts programming related to music.

The channel opened on February 1, 2012, with a new music program Show Champion.

The channel was re-branded on February 2, 2020 as MBC M. The company intends to make the brand more recognizable to the digital audience and build a synergy between television and new media.

Programs
These are MBC M's currently airing programs:

Reality programming
 Astro Project
 We Got Married (simulcast with MBC TV.)
 Dad, Where Are You Going? (simulcast with MBC TV.)
 Infinite Challenge (simulcast with MBC TV.)
 Oh! My Skarf 
 Making of The Star
 Kara Project
 Secret no.1
 Music and Lyrics
 NC.A in Fukuoka
 Idol School
 Ailee's Vitamin
 Younha's Come to My Home
 Powder Room
 Abbey Road
 Gangnam Feel Dance School
 One Fine Day (2013–present)
 Shinee's  One Fine Day (2013)
 B1A4’s One Fine Day (2014)
 VIXX's  One Fine Day (2014)
 Super Junior's One Fine Day (2015)
 Girl's Day's  One Fine Day (2015)
 GFriend's  One Fine Day (2015)
 AOA's  One Fine Day (2015)
 B.A.P's One Fine Day (2016)
 Seventeen's  One Fine Day (2016-2017)
 Gugudan Project - Extreme School Trip (2016)
 B.I.G Project (2017)
 Idol Tour (2017)
 Seventeen Project: Debut Big Plan (2015)

Music programming
 Show! Music Core (Simulcast with MBC-TV.)
 I Music U (no commercial breaks)
 I Music U 4 AM
 I Music U 7 AM 
 I Music U 8 AM 
 I Music U 3 PM 
 I Music U 6 PM 
 I Music U 10 PM
 I Music U Request 
 Daily Best K-pop
 Show Champion (Simulcast live with MBC every1.)
 All The K-pop
 Music Talk Talk My Bling Bling MV
 Old and New
 KPOP Live
 Music Magazine
 Morning Pop
 Music Scanner The Code
 Hot Track
 Live Clip
 MP4
 Shh!

Special programming
 Super Show 5 - A reality television documentary on the South America leg of the tour narrated by member Kangin, broadcast, from 13 June 2013, for six weeks.
MelOn Music Awards (2010–2017, simulcast on MBC Every 1)

See also
 Mnet
 SBS M

References

External links 
 MBC Music Official Website 
 
 

Music television channels
Munhwa Broadcasting Corporation television networks
Television channels in South Korea
Korean-language television stations
Television channels and stations established in 2012
Music organizations based in South Korea